The  or  was an administrative subdivision present in parts of medieval Castile corresponding to a grouping of rural hamlets within the territorial jurisdiction of a town council. Its articulation primarily responded to the purpose of tax collection, and, insofar they served the Crown to that end, the latter provided certain formal recognition to the administrative organization. They also served to administer communal property.

References 

Kingdom of Castile
Types of administrative division